Grantham and Stamford is a constituency represented in the House of Commons of the UK Parliament by Gareth Davies, a Conservative.

Boundaries 

1997–2010: The District of South Kesteven wards of All Saints, Aveland, Barrowby, Belmont, Bourne East, Bourne West, Casewick, Devon, Earlesfield, Forest, Glen Eden, Grantham St John's, Greyfriars, Harrowby, Hillsides, Isaac Newton, Lincrest, Morkery, Peascliffe, Ringstone, St Anne's, St George's, St Mary's, St Wulfram's, Stamford St John's, and Toller.

Since 2010: The District of South Kesteven wards of All Saints, Aveland, Belmont, Bourne East, Bourne West, Earlesfield, Forest, Glen Eden, Grantham St John's, Green Hill, Greyfriars, Harrowby, Hillsides, Isaac Newton, Lincrest, Morkery, Ringstone, St Anne's, St George's, St Mary's, St Wulfram's, Stamford St John's, Thurlby, Toller, and Truesdale.

The constituency covers the towns Grantham and Stamford in Lincolnshire with surrounding villages.  Most of the constituency was formerly in the Stamford and Spalding constituency. As well as the two Lincolnshire constituencies that it neighbours (Sleaford and South Holland), it neighbours Rutland and Melton to the west, and North West Cambridgeshire to the south. All five are academically considered, based on results in recent elections, Conservative safe seats.

2010 revision
Following a Boundary Commission review for the 2010 election, the constituency's boundary with the Sleaford and North Hykeham constituency saw more wards ceded to the latter seat and all of Truesdale was united into this seat, which before was shared with South Holland and The Deepings. The recommendation saw an estimated electorate size of 73,336. The new boundary does not include Barrowby, Sedgebrook, Great Gonerby or Belton but includes Baston and Langtoft.

Constituency profile
This is a large rural seat in southern Lincolnshire. Grantham and Stamford are at the extreme north and south of the seat, with a large swathe of agricultural countryside between them, dotted with small rural villages. The only other large settlement in the seat is the rapidly growing town of Bourne, situated at the west of the Lincolnshire Fens. Food processing and agriculture are the major industries.

Politically, Grantham is associated with former Conservative Prime Minister Margaret Thatcher, who was born and raised in the town. However, the town of Grantham itself probably has the biggest Labour Party support of the constituency. The rural part of the seat and the historical town of Stamford outweigh any Labour votes in Grantham, and it is normally a safe Conservative seat. The history of Conservative representation was briefly interrupted between 2007 and 2010 when the sitting Conservative MP, Quentin Davies defected to Labour, as well as 2019 when an MP, Nick Boles, left the Conservative Party.

Workless claimants were in November 2012 significantly lower than the national average of 3.8%, at 2.8% of the population based on a statistical compilation by The Guardian.

Local government 
The whole constituency lies within the area served by Lincolnshire County Council and South Kesteven District Council.

Members of Parliament

Elections

Elections in the 2010s

Elections in the 2000s

Elections in the 1990s

See also 
 List of parliamentary constituencies in Lincolnshire
 Stamford (UK Parliament list of constituencies)

Notes

References

External links
 BBC Election 2010
 GCSE results in the constituency
 Election Maps
 Ask Aristotle
 Statistical data at DEFRA

Parliamentary constituencies in Lincolnshire
Constituencies of the Parliament of the United Kingdom established in 1997
South Kesteven District
Politics of Grantham